Buckode is a small village and townland in County Leitrim, Ireland. It lies south of Lough Melvin on the R281 regional road.

References

Towns and villages in County Leitrim